Voices in the Tunnels (Formerly titled "In Search of the Mole People") is a 2008 documentary directed by Vic David, a New York City filmmaker and a graduate from New York University. It explores the lives of people who lived in the New York City Subway tunnels.

See also
 Dark Days (film), a 2000 documentary on New York City tunnel inhabitants by filmmaker Marc Singer
 Freedom Tunnel, a railroad tunnel in New York City frequently inhabited by homeless people
 Mole people, homeless people living under large cities in abandoned subway, railroad, flood, and sewage tunnels
 Tunnel People, a 2010 book on New York City tunnel inhabitants by anthropologist and journalist Teun Voeten
 Urban exploration, the exploration of man-made structures including tunnels as a hobby

External links

http://www.journeyman.tv/59381/documentaries/voices-in-the-tunnels.html

American documentary films
2008 films
2008 documentary films
Documentary films about New York City
Documentary films about homelessness in the United States
Films set on the New York City Subway
Subterranea of the United States
2000s English-language films
2000s American films